The Russians Are Coming, the Russians Are Coming is a 1966 American comedy film directed and produced by Norman Jewison for the United Artists. It is based on the 1961 Nathaniel Benchley novel The Off-Islanders, and was adapted for the screen by William Rose.

The film depicts the chaos following the grounding of the Soviet submarine Спрут (pronounced "sproot" and meaning "octopus") off a small New England island during the Cold War. It stars Carl Reiner, Eva Marie Saint, Alan Arkin in his first major film role, Brian Keith, Theodore Bikel, Jonathan Winters, John Phillip Law, Tessie O'Shea, and Paul Ford. It was shot by cinematographer Joseph F. Biroc in DeLuxe Color and Panavision.

The film was released by United Artists on May 25, 1966, to critical acclaim. At the 24th Golden Globe Awards, the film won in two categories (Best Motion Picture – Musical or Comedy and Best Actor – Motion Picture Musical or Comedy for Arkin), and was nominated for four Academy Awards (Best Picture, Best Actor for Arkin, Best Adapted Screenplay, and Best Editing).

Plot

A Soviet Navy submarine called Спрут (Octopus) draws too close to the New England coast one September morning when its captain wants to take a good look at America and runs aground on a sandbar near the fictional Gloucester Island, off the New England coast, with a population of about 200 local residents. Rather than radio for help and risk an embarrassing international incident, the captain sends a nine-man landing party, headed by his zampolit (Political officer) Lieutenant Yuri Rozanov, to find a motor launch to help free the submarine from the bar. The men arrive at the house of Walt Whittaker, a vacationing playwright from New York City. Whittaker is eager to get his wife Elspeth and two children, obnoxious but precocious -year-old Pete and 3-year-old Annie, off the island now that summer is over.

Pete tells his disbelieving dad that "nine Russians with tommy guns" dressed in black uniforms are near the house, but Walt is soon met by Rozanov and one of his men, Alexei Kolchin, who identify themselves as strangers on the island and ask if there are any boats available. Walt is skeptical and asks if they are "Russians with machine guns," which startles Rozanov into admitting that they are Russians, and pulling a gun on Walt. Walt provides information on the lack of military and the small police forces of their island, and Rozanov promises no harm to the Whittakers if they hand over their station wagon. Elspeth provides the car keys, but before the Russians depart, Rozanov orders Alexei to prevent the Whittakers from fleeing. When Alison Palmer, an attractive 18-year-old neighbor who works as Annie's babysitter, arrives for work that day, they take her captive, as well.

The Whittakers' station wagon quickly runs out of gasoline, forcing the Russians to walk. They steal an old sedan from Muriel Everett, the postmistress; she calls Alice Foss, the gossipy telephone switchboard operator, and before long, wild rumors about Russian parachutists and an air assault on the airport throw the entire island into confusion. Level-headed Police Chief Link Mattocks and his bumbling assistant Norman Jonas try to squelch an inept citizens' militia led by the blustering Fendall Hawkins.

Meanwhile, Walt, accompanied by Elspeth and Pete, manages to overpower Alexei, because the Russian is reluctant to hurt anyone. Alexei flees during the commotion, but when Walt, Elspeth, and Pete leave to find help, he returns to retrieve his weapon from the house, where only Alison and Annie remain. Alexei says that although he wants no fighting, he must obey his superiors in guarding the residence. He promises he will harm nobody and offers to surrender his gun as proof. Alison tells him that she trusts him and does not want his firearm. Alexei and Alison become attracted to each other, take a walk along the beach with Annie, and find commonality despite their different cultures and the Cold War hostility between their countries.

Trying to find the Russians himself, Walt is recaptured by them in the telephone central office. After subduing Mrs. Foss and tying  Walt and her  together, and disabling the island's telephone switchboard, seven of the Russians appropriate civilian clothes from a dry cleaner's, manage to steal a cabin cruiser, and head to the submarine, which is still aground. Back at the Whittaker house, Alexei and Alison have kissed and fallen in love. At the phone exchange, Walt and Mrs. Foss manage to hop outside the office, but fall down the stairs to the sidewalk below. They are discovered there by Elspeth and Pete, who untie them.  They return to their house, and Walt shoots at and almost kills Rozanov, who had reached there just ahead of them. With the misunderstandings cleared up, the Whittakers, Rozanov, and Alexei decide to head into town together to explain to everyone just what is going on.

As the tide rises, the sub floats off the sandbar before the cabin cruiser arrives, and it proceeds on the surface to the island's main harbor. Chief Mattocks, having investigated and debunked the rumor of an aerial assault, arrives back in town with the civilian militia. With Rozanov acting as translator, the Russian captain threatens to open fire on the town with his deck gun and machine guns unless the seven missing sailors are returned to him; his crew faces upwards of 100 armed, apprehensive, but determined townspeople. As the situation nears the breaking point, two small boys climb up to the church steeple to see better and one slips and falls from the steeple, but his belt catches on a gutter, leaving him precariously hanging 40 feet (12 m) in the air. The American islanders and the Russian submariners immediately unite to form a human pyramid to rescue the boy.

Peace and harmony are established between the two parties, but unfortunately, the overeager Hawkins has contacted the Air Force by radio. In a joint decision, the submarine heads out of the harbor with a convoy of villagers in small boats protecting it. Alexei says goodbye to Alison, the stolen boat with the missing Russian sailors meets its sub shortly thereafter, and the seven board the submarine, just before two Air Force F-101B Voodoo jets arrive. The jets break off after seeing the escorting flotilla of small craft, and to the cheers of the islanders, the Octopus is free to proceed to deep water and safety.

Luther Grilk, the town drunk, who had been trying to mount his horse, finally succeeds and rides heroically to the outer parts of the island shouting "The Russians are coming! The Russians are coming!", not knowing that they have already left.

Cast

Production

Although set on the fictional "Gloucester Island" off the coast of Massachusetts, the movie was filmed on the coast of Northern California, mainly in Mendocino. The harbor scenes were filmed in Noyo Harbor in Fort Bragg, California, about 7 miles (11 km) north of Mendocino. Because of the filming location on the West Coast, the dawn scene at the beginning of the film was actually filmed at dusk through a pink filter.

The submarine used was a fabrication. The United States Navy refused to lend one for the production, so they asked the Russian Embassy for a Soviet submarine, which was similarly refused. The Mirisch Company rented a mockup of a submarine that had been used in the 1965 film Morituri.

The planes used were actual F-101 Voodoo jets from the 84th Fighter-Interceptor Squadron, located at the nearby Hamilton Air Force Base. They were the only Air Force planes that were based near the location of the supposed island.

The title alludes to Paul Revere's midnight ride, as does the subplot in which the town drunk (Ben Blue) rides his horse to warn people of the "invasion".

Pablo Ferro created the main title sequence, using the American flag's red, white, and blue colors and the Soviet hammer and sickle as transitional elements, zooming into each to create a montage, which ultimately worked to establish the tone of the film. The music in the sequence alternates between the American "Yankee Doodle" march and a combination of the Russian songs "Polyushko Pole"  (Полюшко Поле, usually "Meadowlands" in English) and the "Song of the Volga Boatmen".

Much of the dialog was spoken by the Russian characters, played by American actors at a time when few American actors were adept at Russian accents. Musician and character actor Leon Belascowho was born in Russia, spoke fluent Russian and specialized in foreign accents during his 60-year careerwas the dialog director. Alan Arkin, a Russian speaker raised in a Russian Jewish household, did so well as Rozanov that he would later in his career be sought to play both American and ethnic characters. Theodore Bikel was able to pronounce Russian so well (he had taken a few classes, but was not at all fluent in the language) that he won the role of the submarine captain. Alex Hassilev, of The Limelighters, also spoke fluent Russian and played the sailor Hrushevsky. John Phillip Law's incorrect pronunciation of difficult English phonemes, most notably in Alison Palmer's name ("ah-LYEE-sown PAHL-myerr"), was unusually authentic by the standards of the day. Brian Keith, who also spoke fluent Russian, did not do so in the film.

Musical score and soundtrack

The film score was composed, arranged and conducted by Johnny Mandel and the soundtrack album was released on the United Artists label in 1966. Film Score Monthly reviewed Mandel's soundtrack in their liner notes for their reissue of the score, noting the presence of Russian folk songs, writing that "These pre-existing melodies mix with original Mandel compositions, including a Russian choral anthem, a humorous march theme for the island residents' quasi-military response to the Soviet incursion, and a tender love theme...". "The Shining Sea" was sung on the soundtrack by Irene Kral, although it had featured as an instrumental in the film itself. The lyrics to "The Shining Sea" were written by Peggy Lee, who was contractually bound to Capitol Records, and so unable to appear on the soundtrack album. The line "His hands, his strong brown hands" was believed by Lee's friends to be a reference to Quincy Jones with whom she had a brief affair. Lee herself later recorded "The Shining Sea" with her lyrics on May 21, 1966. Mandel had played the music for "The Shining Sea" to Lee, and had asked her to "paint a word picture" of what she had heard. Lee's lyrics, by coincidence, exactly matched the action on the screen of the two lovers on the beach, which astonished Mandel, who had not shown her the film.

Track listing
All compositions by Johnny Mandel unless otherwise indicated

 "The Russians Are Coming...The Russians Are Coming" - 01:37
 "The Shining Sea" (lyrics by Peggy Lee) - 02:42
 "Hop Along" - 02:25
 "Volga Boat Song" (arranged by Mandel) - 01:22
 "Escorts Away (The Russians Are Coming)" - 03:45
 "The Shining Sea" - 03:14
 "Sailor's Chorus" (Bonia Shur, Mandel) - 02:45
 "Tipperary" (Harry J. Williams, Jack Judge) - 00:32
 "The Airport" - 02:14
 "The Russians Are Coming...The Russians Are Coming" - 02:09

Reception

Robert Alden of The New York Times called it "a rousingly funny – and perceptive – motion picture about a desperately unfunny world situation." Arthur D. Murphy of Variety declared it "an outstanding cold-war comedy," adding that Jewison "has made expert use of all types of comedy technique, scripted and acted in excellent fashion by both pros and some talented newcomers to pix."

Philip K. Scheuer of the Los Angeles Times wrote, "Considering that it is made up of variations on a single theme, the picture is astonishingly inventive. And considering that it was never done as a play on the stage (where laughs can be pre-tested and rough spots ironed out) it racks up a high average indeed, though it has its lapses and some of its points are forced—over-milked, as they say in the trade." Richard L. Coe of The Washington Post called it "a refreshingly witty topical comedy ... Some exceptionally skilled comics, familiar and unfamiliar, are extremely amusing." The Monthly Film Bulletin wrote that the film "almost falls flat when it indulges in sententious philosophising about the need for Russians and Americans to live peacefully together," but is "considerably helped by an amiable script (by former Ealing writer William Rose) which often manages to invest the film with the high farce of the best of the Ealing comedies." Brendan Gill of The New Yorker called it "an unfunny big farce ... The heavy-handed producer and director of the picture, Norman Jewison, has permitted nearly every moment of it to become twice as brightly colored, twice as noisy, and twice as frantic as it needed to be; this is all the more a pity because the cast includes a number of excellent comic actors."

According to Norman Jewison, the filmreleased at the height of the Cold Warhad considerable impact in both Washington and Moscow. It was one of the few American films of the time to portray the Russians in a positive light.  Senator Ernest Gruening mentioned the film in a speech in Congress, and a copy of it was screened in the Kremlin. According to Jewison, when screened at the Soviet film writers' union, Sergei Bondarchuk was moved to tears. Jewison, in an interview, also stated that not only were the Russians thrilled with the movie, they were a little disappointed they hadn't thought of the plot first.

Awards and honors

See also
 List of American films of 1966
 The Russians are coming
 Whiskey on the rocks
 Russkies

References

External links
 
 
 
 
 

1966 films
1966 comedy films
American comedy films
American political satire films
Best Musical or Comedy Picture Golden Globe winners
Cold War submarine films
Films based on American novels
Films based on works by Nathaniel Benchley
Films directed by Norman Jewison
Films featuring a Best Musical or Comedy Actor Golden Globe winning performance
Films scored by Johnny Mandel
Films shot in California
Films set in Massachusetts
Military humor in film
United Artists films
Cold War films
Photoplay Awards film of the year winners
Soviet submarine accidents
Sprut
Films about World War III
1960s English-language films
1960s American films